Stout Spur is a knife-like rock spur descending from the north edge of Mackin Table, 3 nautical miles (6 km) east of Mount Campleman, in the Patuxent Range, Pensacola Mountains. Mapped by United States Geological Survey (USGS) from surveys and U.S. Navy air photos, 1956–66. Named by Advisory Committee on Antarctic Names (US-ACAN) for Dennis K. Stout, radioman at Palmer Station, winter 1967.

Ridges of Queen Elizabeth Land